Borchgrevink Glacier is a large glacier in the Victory Mountains, Victoria Land, draining south between Malta Plateau and Daniell Peninsula, and thence projecting into Glacier Strait, Ross Sea, as a floating glacier tongue, the Borchgrevink Glacier Tongue, just south of Cape Jones. It was named by the New Zealand Geological Survey Antarctic Expedition, 1957–58, for Carsten Borchgrevink, leader of the British Antarctic Expedition, 1898–1900. Borchgrevink visited the area in February 1900 and first observed the seaward portion of the glacier.

The Borchgrevink Glacier has several contributing glaciers:
Ingham Glacier, a tributary glacier 3 miles (5 km) west of Humphries Glacier, flowing south into Borchgrevink Glacier; mapped by the United States Geological Survey (USGS) from surveys and U.S. Navy air photos, between 1960 and 1962. It was named by the Advisory Committee on Antarctic Names (US-ACAN) for Clayton E. Ingham, New Zealand geophysicist at Hallett Station, 1957.
Humphries Glacier, a steep tributary glacier just east of Ingham Glacier, flowing generally southwestward to join Borchgrevink Glacier northwestward of Mount Prior. It was mapped by the USGS from surveys and U.S. Navy air photos, between 1960 and 1962, and named by US-ACAN for John G. Humphries, New Zealand ionospheric scientist at Hallett Station, 1957.
Behr Glacier, a steep tributary glacier, 7 miles (11 km) long, flowing east along the north side of Clapp Ridge to join Borchgrevink Glacier. The glacier first appears on a 1960 New Zealand map compiled from U.S. Navy aerial photographs. Named by US-ACAN for Col. Robert Behr, USAF, who was of assistance in the review of U.S. policy toward Antarctica in the 1970-71 period.
Hand Glacier, a deeply entrenched valley glacier that drains the east slopes of Malta Plateau and flows east along the south side of Clapp Ridge into the Borchgrevink Glacier. It was mapped by the USGS from surveys and U.S. Navy air photos between 1960 and 64, and was named by US-ACAN for Cadet H. Hand, biologist at McMurdo Station, in 1967–68.
Line Glacier, a glacier that drains the south part of the east slopes of Malta Plateau and flows east between Collins Peak and Mount Alberts into Borchgrevink Glacier; mapped by the USGS from surveys and U.S. Navy air photos between 1960 and 1964, and named by US-ACAN for Kenneth Line, traverse engineer with the United States Antarctic Research Program (USARP) glaciological party at Roosevelt Island, 1967–68.
Bargh Glacier, a glacier 6 miles (10 km) long in the southwest part of Daniell Peninsula, 2 miles (3 km) north of Langevad Glacier, whose stream it parallels, and flows southwest to enter Borchgrevink Glacier; mapped by the USGS from surveys and U.S. Navy air photos between 1960 and 1964; named by US-ACAN for Kenneth A. Bargh, seismologist at Hallett Station, in 1958.
Langevad Glacier, located 2 miles (3 km) south of Bargh Glacier and just west of Narrow Neck, draining southwest from the Daniell Peninsula into the lower part of Borchgrevink Glacier. It was mapped by the USGS from surveys and U.S. Navy air photos, between 1960 and 1964, and named by US-ACAN for Michael W. Langevad, electronics technician at Hallett Station, 1957.

See also
 List of glaciers in the Antarctic
 Glaciology

References
 
 

Glaciers of Borchgrevink Coast